Zulfiqar Ahmad Naqshbandi (born 1 April 1953) is a Pakistani Islamic scholar and a Sufi shaykh of the Naqshbandi order. His notable disciples include Mufti Muhammad Ayoub Sahab Kashmiri,.

He is the founder of Mahadul-Faqir Al-Islami, Jhang.

Biography
In 2011, Zulfiqar Ahmad Naqshbandi travelled to India and addressed in few organized programs at Eidgah Bilali Mansab tank and Chanchalguda Junior College in Hyderabad. He also spoke at programs in the Masjid Rasheed of Darul Uloom Deoband and at Darul Uloom Waqf, Deoband.

In December 2018, Zulfiqar Ahmad Naqshbandi said that conspiracies against the belief of Finality of Prophethood are a matter of concern for Muslims. Ahmadis / Qadyanis must be made to follow the law of the country, and they should be removed from the key posts.

A question asked at the Darul Ifta of Darul Uloom Deoband about Naqshbandi's reliability was answered as "Zulfiqar Ahmad Naqshbandi is a credible elderly figure of the Naqshbandi order and follows the same track as of the scholars of Deoband".

Mr. Zulfiqar Ahmad Naqshbandi was among the world's 500 most influential Muslims during 2013 / 14.  The 500 Most Influential Muslims.

Even though Sufi intellectual output has fallen in modern times, Naqshbandi remains an exception and has published widely.

Literary works 
Zulfiqar Ahmad Naqshbandi's books include:
 Fiqh ke buniyādī uṣūl
 Zād-i ḥaram
 Nurturing the budding rose : a complete guide to the upbringing of children
 K̲h̲avātīn-i Islām ke kārnāme
 Ḥayāʼ aur pākdāminī
 Ahle Dil Kay Tarpa Dainay Walay Waqiat
 Ilm e-Nafe
 Gunahoon Say Toba Kijiyay
 Quran-e-Majeed kay Adbi Israr o-Ramooz
 Tasawwuf wa Sulook

References

External links
 https://alhamdolillah.com/book-publisher/maktab-e-faqeer-faisalabad/

1953 births
Deobandis
Living people
People from Jhang District
University of Engineering and Technology, Lahore alumni
Pakistani Sufi religious leaders
Pakistani Sunni Muslim scholars of Islam
Pakistani religious writers
Pakistani YouTubers